Caryocolum mucronatella is a moth of the family Gelechiidae. It is found in Portugal, Spain, France, Germany, Austria, Switzerland, Italy, Slovenia, North Macedonia, Greece and Turkey.

The length of the forewings is 4.5-5.5 mm for males and 4–5.5 mm for females. The forewings are dark brown to black, basally mottled with orange-brown. Adults have been recorded on wing from the end of June to late August.

The larvae feed on the leaves of Minuartia mutabilis, Minuartia setacea, Minuartia verna attica and Minuartia laricifolia. They live in silken webs which are extended from the root-stock to the terminal parts of the host plant. Larvae can be found from late May to mid-July.

References

Moths described in 1900
mucronatella
Moths of Europe
Moths of Asia